{{Automatic taxobox
| taxon = Olividae
| image = Oliva kaleontina.jpg
| image_caption = live Vullietoliva kaleontina
| image2 = Lettered olive 0015.jpg
| image2_caption = Shells of Lettered olive, Americoliva sayana
| authority = Latreille, 1825
| synonyms_ref = 
| synonyms = Olivancillariidae
| subdivision_ranks = Genera
| subdivision = See text
}}

Olive snails, also known as olive shells and olives, scientific name Olividae, are a taxonomic family of medium to large predatory sea snails with smooth, shiny, elongated oval-shaped shells.

The shells often show various muted but attractive colors, and may be patterned also. They are marine gastropod molluscs in the family Olividae within the main clade Neogastropoda.

Taxonomy
According to the Revised Classification, Nomenclator and Typification of Gastropod Families (2017)  the family Olividae consists of five subfamilies:

 Olivinae Latreille, 1825 – synonyms: Dactylidae H. Adams & A. Adams, 1853 (inv.);  
Agaroniinae Olsson, 1956
Calyptolivinae Kantor, Fedosov, Puillandre, Bonillo & Bouchet, 2017
Olivancillariinae Golikov & Starobogatov, 1975
Olivellinae Troschel, 1869

Distribution
Olive snails are found worldwide, in subtropical and tropical seas and oceans.

Habitat
These snails are  found on sandy substrates intertidally and subtidally.

Life habits
The olive snails are all carnivorous sand-burrowers. They feed mostly on bivalves and carrion and are known as some of the fastest burrowers among snails.  They secrete a mucus similar to that of the Muricidae, from which a purple dye can be made.

Shell description
Physically the shells are oval and cylindrical in shape.  They have a well-developed stepped spire.  Olive shells have a siphonal notch at the posterior end of the long narrow aperture. The siphon of the living animal protrudes from the siphon notch.

The shell surface is extremely glossy because in life the mantle almost always covers the shell.Vermeij, Geerat J (3 April 1995). A Natural History of Shells. Princeton University Press. . pps. 89, 100, 114.

The fossil record
Olive shells first appeared during the Campanian.

Human use
Olive shells are popular with shell collectors, and are also often made into jewelry and other decorative items.

The shell of the lettered olive, Oliva sayana, is the state shell of South Carolina in the United States.

Genera
Genera within the family Olividae include:
 Agaronia Gray, 1839Americoliva Petuch, 2013 (synonym of Oliva)
 Callianax H. Adams & A. Adams, 1853 
 Calyptoliva Kantor & Bouchet, 2007 
 Cupidoliva Iredale, 1924Felicioliva Petuch & Berschauer, 2017
 † Lamprodomina Marwick, 1931Miniaceoliva Petuch & Sargent, 1986
 Oliva  Bruguière, 1789
 Olivancillaria d'Orbigny, 1840Omogymna Martens, 1897
 † Pseudolivella Glibert, 1960 Recourtoliva Petuch & Berschauer, 2017
 † Spirancilla H. E. Vokes, 1936
†Torqueoliva Landau, da Silva & Heitz, 2016 
 Uzamakiella Habe, 1958Vullietoliva Petuch & Berschauer, 2017

Genera brought into synonymy
 Chilotygma H. Adams & A. Adams, 1853: synonym of Ancilla Lamarck, 1799
 Hiatula Swainson, 1831: synonym of  Agaronia Gray, 1839
 Lintricula H. Adams & A. Adams, 1853: synonym of  Olivancillaria d'Orbigny, 1840
 Porphyria Röding, 1798 : synonym of  Oliva Bruguière, 1789
 Scaphula Swainson, 1840: synonym of  Olivancillaria d'Orbigny, 1840

See also
 Olivella'' This genus has now been moved to the Olivellidae according to the taxonomy of Bouchet & Rocroi.

References

Further reading
 Hunon Ch., Hoarau A. & Robin A. (2009). Olividae (Mollusca, Gastropoda).

External links
 Miocene Gastropods and Biostratigraphy of the Kern River Area, California; United States Geological Survey Professional Paper 642 

 
Olivoidea
Gastropod families